Jeff Underhill (1927–1978) was an Australian writer and journalist.

Career
He was a regular writer on the Friday night edition of In Melbourne Tonight hosted by Noel Ferrier, who wrote in his memoirs that Underhill "possessed one of the most original talents for script writing I have ever encountered and I was extraordinarily luck to have him on the team. He wrote the entire show - no small effort on a weekly basis."

Select credits
The Ballad of Angel's Alley (1958) – stage musical, first performed at the New Theatre, Melbourne in December 1958
Night of the Ding-Dong (1961) - writer
Alice in Wonderland (1962 film) - writer
In Melbourne Tonight (1962) – writer
The Noel Ferrier Show (1964) – TV writer
A Small Wonder (1966) – TV play

References

Notes

External links
Jeff Underhill at IMDb

Australian screenwriters
1927 births
1978 deaths
20th-century Australian screenwriters